Sabakhi (also Romanized as Sabakhī and Sabkhi) is a village in Howmeh Rural District, in the Central District of Lamerd County, Fars Province, Iran. At the 2006 census, its population was 200, in 52 families.

References 

Populated places in Lamerd County